Sixty was a concert tour by the Rolling Stones. The tour, announced on 14 March 2022, began on 1 June 2022 in Madrid, Spain, and concluded on 3 August 2022 in Berlin, Germany. It was the first European tour without drummer Charlie Watts following his death in August 2021, and the first time that the Stones performed their 1966 song "Out of Time" live.

Format

The tour venues announced were typically large outdoor stadiums. An exception was the two Hyde Park, London shows, which were open-space events with a 65,000 capacity.

As has been the case since the No Filter Tour, the stadium shows featured general admission standing areas. Premium-cost gold circle and pit sections closer to the stage were also offered to varying degrees at each venue.

There was no b-stage to which the band wholly relocate; however, a central outward walkway existed where band members typically moved into briefly throughout the shows.

Setlist
The following set list was obtained from the concert held on 1 June 2022 at the Wanda Metropolitano stadium in Madrid. It does not represent all concerts for the duration of the tour.

"Street Fighting Man"
"19th Nervous Breakdown"
"Sad Sad Sad"
"Tumbling Dice"
"Out of Time"
"Beast of Burden"
"You Can't Always Get What You Want"
"Living in a Ghost Town"
"Honky Tonk Women"
"Happy"
"Slipping Away"
"Miss You"
"Midnight Rambler"
"Start Me Up"
"Paint it Black"
"Sympathy for the Devil"
"Jumpin' Jack Flash"
"Gimme Shelter"
"(I Can't Get No) Satisfaction"

Tour dates

Cancelled dates

Personnel

The Rolling Stones
 Mick Jagger – lead vocals, guitar, harmonica, percussion
 Keith Richards – guitars, backing and lead vocals
 Ronnie Wood – guitars

Additional musicians
 Chuck Leavell – keyboards, backing vocals
 Bernard Fowler – backing vocals, percussion
 Matt Clifford – keyboards, percussion, French horn
 Darryl Jones – bass
 Tim Ries – saxophone, keyboards
 Karl Denson – saxophone
 Sasha Allen – backing vocals
 Steve Jordan – drums

References

The Rolling Stones concert tours
2022 concert tours
Concert tours of Europe